Mohamed Wurie Jalloh (born October 3, 1956) is a Sierra Leonean politician who is currently serving as the deputy mayor of Bo, the second largest city in Sierra Leone. He is an elected councilor in the Bo City Council and a member of the Sierra Leone People's Party.

References

External links
http://mysierraleoneonline.com/sl_portal/site/news/detail/960

Sierra Leonean politicians
Living people
1956 births
People from Bo, Sierra Leone